Ulysses 'Slim' Hollimon (born June 23, 1931) is a former professional baseball pitcher who played in the Negro American League in a nine-season span from 1948 through 1956. Born in Amory, Mississippi, he batted and threw right handed.

Hollimon played for several teams during his time in the league, most prominently with the Birmingham Black Barons and the Baltimore Elite Giants. Besides, he pitched in the East–West All-Star Game held at Comiskey Park in 1951, where he hit a double.

Afterwards, Hollimon attended Tennessee A&I College and was employed by the Ford Motor Company for 33 years. In addition, he coached Little League Baseball for many years in Plattsburg, Missouri, where he settled.

Prior to the 2008 MLB Draft, the Kansas City Royals selected Hollimon as a pitcher in the special draft of the surviving Negro league players. Baseball Hall of Fame player Dave Winfield conceived the idea to have this draft,  which allowed the MLB teams each select a former NLB player to rectify and recognize those ballplayers who did not have the opportunity to play in the major leagues on the basis of race.

Sources

External links
Negro Leagues Baseball Museum
Retired Negro Leaguers Drafted into the Majors

1931 births
Living people
African-American baseball players
Baltimore Elite Giants players
Baseball pitchers
Birmingham Black Barons players
People from Amory, Mississippi
People from Plattsburg, Missouri
Baseball players from Mississippi
21st-century African-American people